Roxania is a genus of gastropods belonging to the family Alacuppidae. 

The genus has almost cosmopolitan distribution.

Species:

Roxania aequatorialis 
 †Roxania alpha 
Roxania argoblysis 
 †Roxania chipolana 
Roxania eburneola 
 Roxania japonica (Habe, 1976)
Roxania lithensis 
Roxania mediolaevigata 
Roxania modesta 
Roxania monterosatoi 
Roxania morgana 
Roxania pinguicula 
Roxania pseudosemistriata 
Roxania semilaevis 
Roxania simillima 
Roxania smithae 
Roxania utriculus 
Roxania ventricosa 
Synonyms
 Roxania pacifica (Habe, 1956): synonym of Mimatys pacifica (Habe, 1956)
 Roxania punctulata (A. Adams, 1862): synonym of Mimatys punctulatus (A. Adams, 1862)
 Roxania subrotunda Monterosato, 1890: synonym of Roxania pinguicula (G. Seguenza, 1880)
 Roxania umbilicata (Habe, 1956): synonym of Mimatys umbilicatus (Habe, 1956)

References

External links
 Gray, J. E. (1847). On the classification of the British Mollusca by W E Leach. Annals and Magazine of Natural History. (1) 20: 267-273

Gastropods